This list of Canadian art awards covers some of the main art awards given by organizations in Canada. Some are restricted to Canadian artists in a particular genre or from a given region, while others are broader in scope.

See also
Lists of art awards
Salt Spring National Art Prize www.saltspringartprize.ca

References

 
Canadian